Roger Corbet (c. 1501–1538) was an English politician and landowner.

Roger Corbet or Corbett may also refer to:

Roger Corbet (died 1395), ancestor of the above, MP for Shropshire in three Parliaments
Roger Corbet (died 1430), his son, MP twice for Shrewsbury and once for Shropshire

See also
Roger Corbett, Australian businessman
Roger Corbett (disambiguation)